Dynein ATPase (dynein adenosine 5'-triphosphatase) is an enzyme with systematic name ATP phosphohydrolase (tubulin-translocating). This enzyme catalyses the following chemical reaction

 ATP + H2O  ADP + phosphate

This enzyme is a multisubunit protein complex associated with microtubules.

See also 
 Dynein

References

External links 
 

EC 3.6.4